Narciso Fernández Cayetano (born November 5, 1978) is a Honduran former footballer who played as a full back, midfielder and forward.

Club career
Nicknamed Kalusha, Fernández played the majority of his career for Marathón and also had spells at Olimpia, Marathón, Platense and Hispano. He rejoined Platense ahead of the 2008 Clausura.

He scored 23 league goals in total.

International career
Fernández made three international appearances for Honduras, playing in the 2001 UNCAF Nations Cup against Panama, Nicaragua, and El Salvador.

Personal life
Fernández is married with Nelly and has five son, the wedding was celebrated in Guadalupe

A

References

External links
 

1978 births
Living people
People from Colón Department (Honduras)
Honduran footballers
Honduras international footballers
C.D. Marathón players
C.D. Olimpia players
Platense F.C. players
Hispano players
Liga Nacional de Fútbol Profesional de Honduras players
2001 UNCAF Nations Cup players
Association football utility players